William IV, Count of Forcalquier (1130–1208) was the son of Bertrand I, Count of Forcalquier and Josserande de la Flotte. William married Adelaide de Beziers, daughter of Saura de Carcassonne and Raimond Trencavel of Beziers Viscount of Beziers, of Agde, of Albi, of Carcassonne, and of Razès.

He co-ruled the county with his brother Bertrand II, who died leaving him as sole count. 

William's daughter Garsenda, who married Rainou of Sabran, Lord of Caylar and Ansouis, predeceased him so his granddaughter of the same name inherited his county at the age of 13. William signed the Treaty of Aix in July 1193, with Alfonso II, who was in line to become Count of Provence, betrothing her to himself in marriage.

References

Bibliography

Counts of Forcalquier
12th-century French people
1130 births
1208 deaths